Mountsfield Park is a public park in Catford, near to Hither Green within the London Borough of Lewisham. It opened in 1905 and has been greatly enlarged. The nearest railway stations are Hither Green, Catford and Catford Bridge.

History of the park
The core area of the park was originally part of Mountsfield, a substantial house and grounds, built in 1845 for the noted microlepidopterist and entomologist Henry Tibbats Stainton by his father as a wedding gift.

Over time, the park was substantially enlarged, with land bought from the School Board for London and further allotment land acquired. An area used for a short time as a football ground by Charlton Athletic FC was added to the park in 1923/4. A bombed row of houses in George Lane was added after World War II and a further tranche of land formerly used as playing fields by Catford Boys School in Brownhill Road was added in 1994.

The house itself, which stood in the north-east corner of the park, was demolished in 1905, but stables and outbuildings were retained and used as park keepers’ buildings until a fire destroyed them in 1969. A former museum for Stainton’s entomology collections was a tearoom until its demolition in 1981.

Layout and notable features
The biggest gates to the Park are on Carswell Road. Facilities include football pitches, tennis courts, ball court and children’s play area. Because of its size, location and parking, it is often used for large events, including Lewisham Borough Council’s People’s Day event in July, typically attracting crowds of over 30,000.

The park also includes a bandstand, community garden, meadow grassland, and Edwardian rose garden, while areas of high ground offer views west over Catford and towards Crystal Palace. It is considered a key park by the borough and has a park keeper on Saturdays and Mondays.

References

External sources
Lewisham Council Mountsfield Park page
Friends of Mountsfield Park
Mountsfield Park archaeological impact assessment by the London Museum, detailing park history and topography

Parks and open spaces in the London Borough of Lewisham